Pietro Durazzo (Genoa, 1632Genoa, 31 July 1699) was the 128th Doge of the Republic of Genoa and king of Corsica.

Biography 
Elected on 23 August 1685, the new doge of Genoa, the eighty-third in biennial succession and the one hundred and twenty-eighth in republican history, the mandate of Pietro Durazzo was dedicated almost entirely to the reconstruction of the Genoese capital after the devastating French naval bombardment of a year earlier. As doge he was also invested with the related biennial office of king of Corsica. With the end of the Dogate's term, on 23 August 1687, which was followed by his appointment as perpetual prosecutor, he continued to serve the state in various positions. Durazzo died in Genoa on 31 July 1699.

See also 
 Republic of Genoa
 Doge of Genoa

References 

17th-century Doges of Genoa
1632 births
1699 deaths